"No" is a song by British girl group Little Mix. It was released on 12 November 2021 through RCA Records UK as the second single from their first greatest hits album Between Us. It was written by group members Jade Thirlwall, Leigh-Anne Pinnock and Perrie Edwards, along with Tre Jean-Marie, MNEK and Camille, with production by Tre Jean-Marie and MNEK. The song reached number thirty-five on the UK Singles Chart. It was the group's last single release before their hiatus in May 2022. 
It was performed for the first time during The Confetti Tour, the same year.

Background and release 
"No" was the group's first song to be written as a trio, after Jesy Nelson departed from the group in 2020.  Lyrically, the song was inspired by the group's own treatment within the music industry and dealing with past individuals. It was described by Pinnock as "a classic Little Mix track, but also fresh and new at the same time", while Thirlwall explained that "the writing session with Kamille, MNEK, and Tre, had really good energy. We had a good old catch-up and got to write a bop."

The title of the song was announced on 29 October 2021 through the group's social media pages On 8 November 2021, a snippet of the music video was teased on the group's social media accounts. The cover art was revealed on 10 November 2021 with a second snippet of the music video being released on 11 November 2021.

Music video
The music video was released on 12 November 2021, the same day as the song's release. It was directed by Fred Rowson and became the fifth video that Perrie Edwards and Leigh-Anne Pinnock recorded while pregnant.

The video features Little Mix members as "desperate housewives" that take control of the man-child men in their lives by getting them to do chores via a remote control.

Track listings
Digital download and streaming - acoustic version
"No" (acoustic version) - 3:15

Digital download and streaming - Galantis remix
"No" (Galantis remix) - 3:06

Digital extended play (EP)
"No" (acoustic version) - 3:15
"No" (Galantis remix) - 3:06

Charts

Release history

References

2021 singles
2021 songs
Little Mix songs
RCA Records singles
Songs written by MNEK
Songs written by Kamille (musician)
Songs written by Tre Jean-Marie